Tokelau competed at the 2015 Pacific Games in Port Moresby, Papua New Guinea from 4 to 18 July 2015. The country was represented by one athlete, one coach and two officials. Tokelau was one of two countries that did not win a medal during the games.

Squash

Men
 Sam Ben Sipili Iasona

References

Pacific Games
Nations at the 2015 Pacific Games
Tokelau at the Pacific Games